Nawalgarh is a heritage city in Jhunjhunu district of Indian state of Rajasthan. It is part of the Shekhawati region and is midway between Jhunjhunu and Sikar. It is 31.5 km from Sikar and 39.2 km from Jhunjhunu. Nawalgarh is famous for its fresco and havelis and considered as Golden City of Rajasthan. It is also the motherland of some great business families of India .

History 
Thakur Nawal Singh Ji Bahadur (Shekhawat) founded Nawalgarh in 1737 AD at the village site of Rohili, and his descendants rules there till abolition of Jagirs in Rajasthan. Many great business families of Marwari community like Mansinghka, Padias, Birlas, Goenka, Jiwrajka, Khaitan, Nemani, Dharnidharka, Somani, Chhawchharia, Ganeriwala, Murarka, Poddar, Seksaria have their origins from Nawalgarh.  Nawalgarh was a tazimi thikana of Bhojraj Ji Ka sept of Shekhawat in Shekhawati. Nawalgarh was encircled by the high Parkota (walls) consisting of four Pols (gates) in different directions, namely Agoona Darwaja, Bawadi Darwaja (in north), Mandi Darwaja and Nansa Darwaja. Each gate has iron doors. Bala Kila Fort is situated in the center of the Thikana, and Fatehgarh Fort is situated outside the Parkota as an Outpost. The market place of the town and layout of the havelis indicate that the original city was well-planned before construction. Nawalgarh was considered to be the most modern towns of Shekhawati. The Rulers of Nawalgarh belong to the Shekhawat sub-clan (Bhojraj Ji Ka September) of Kachwaha Dynasty of the earlier Jaipur Princely State.

Demographics
As of 2011 India census, Nawalgarh had a population of 95,346. Males constitute 52% of the population and females 48%. Nawalgarh has an average literacy rate of 57%, lower than the national average of 59.5%: male literacy is 68%, and female literacy is 46%. In Nawalgarh, 17% of the population is under 20 years of age.

Geography
It has an average elevation of 379 metres (1243 feet).

Forts and Palace

Nawalgarh Fort (Bala Kila Fort)
Built by Maharaja Nawal Singh. Founded in 1678 AD but today it stands largely disfigured by the modern accretions. Now it houses five banks (SBI, HDFC, CANARA, BANK OF BARODA, PNB, OBC) and a few government offices.

Roop Niwas Palace
About one km from the Nawalgarh fort is the salubrious Roop Niwas Palace. Built by Thakur Kunwar Jagmal Singh Ji. The palace is enchanting with a well-laid garden and fountains. It has now been converted into a heritage hotel.

Anandi Lal Podar Haveli
This haveli, built in the 1920s, houses a school, but has many fine paintings. It is the only haveli in the whole Shekhawati, which has been restored by its owner.

Sheesh Mahal
It is an astounding building with a ceiling mural that includes maps of Nawalgarh and Jaipur.

Other places
Murarka Haveli, Sanganeria Haveli (behind mahamaya mandir), Chhawchharia haweli Bansidhar Bhagat Haveli, Chokhani Haveli, Seksaria Haveli, Bhagat Haveli, Poddar Haveli, Bedia Haveli, Chudi wali Haveli, Morarka Haveli, 8 Haveli, Jummachoudry haveli, are also important sites to visit.

Pulwama martyrs memorial 
On 16 Feb 2019, social worker Narottam Kaler announced the donation of 300 square yard piece of land for a memorial in the memory of Pulwama martyrs.

Temples
Shri Ramdev Ji Mandir (Famous temple of God Ramdevji)
Shri Balaji Mandir (Built by Shree Ramchandra Seva Dham Trust)
Lakshmi Narayan Mandir (Built by Thakur Udai Singh in 1869 V.S.)
Shri Gopinath Ji Mandir (Built by Thakur Nawal Singh)
Shri Bawari Wala Balaji Mandir Bawari gate, (Built by Atma Ram Sharma in 17-10-1972)Shri Kalyan Ji MandirGangamai TempleShri Ganesh MandirMahamaya TempleShri Shanishar MandirShri Hanumangarh Balaji MandirShri Surya TempleShri Shiv MandirShri Narsingh Bhagwan MandirShri Vishwakarma MandirShri Ranisati MandirShri Murli Manohar Mandir'''

Education

Shekhawati region is known for education in Rajasthan. Sikar and Jhunjhunu cities are an important education hubs in the entire region. Nawalgarh can also be considered as an important education hubs in this region. '‘Asha Ka Jharna’' is a voluntary non-profit organization working for the cause of disability since 1997 running three special schools for mentally challenged and hearing impaired children. Seth Gyaniram Bansidhar Podar College and Shri Nawalgarh Mahila Mahavidyalaya are the most important higher educational institutions in the city. Digital Marketing Training Institute also belongs to this city. Apart from these there are few recently opened institutes also offering higher education like Gyan Vihar College. For school education city have some very good schools offering education in Hindi as well as English as a medium of instruction.
Here one of the best known school is Saraswati Senior Secondary School Balwantpura and others are Subodh Public School, Shri Nawalgarh Senior Secondary School, Prerana Senior Secondary School, Gayatri Vidypaeeth Senior Secondary School Shri Seksaria Saraswati Girls Senior Secondary School, GEMS Gurukul International School, New Indian Senior Secondary School, Podar Matushri Senior Secondary School, Godavaribai Ramdev Podar Senior Secondary School, Gautam Balika Senior Secondary School, Shekhawati Public School, Dundlod Vidyapeeth, Dundlod and Dundlod Public school (in Dundlod), Mother Teresa Senior Secondary School, Vidhya Bharti Shikshan Sansthan are few names in the list.

Nawalgarh also has a science park that has a planetarium and galleries showcasing dinosaur models, nuclear science and fun science for students.

Connectivity

Rail
Nawalgarh is connected through broad gauge railway line and situated on the Sikar-Loharu railway line section. The broad gauge section passes through the western corner of the city where the main city railway station situated. Now the city has direct connectivity through broad gauge line section to Delhi via Loharu and to Kota, Jaipur via Sikar and Ringus.

Road
Nawalgarh city starts from Ghoomchakkar on the state highway 8. Recently Nawalgarh got its own bus depot which is situated on the north-west side of the city along with state highway 8. State Highway-8 passes through center of city which connects city to Sikar and Jhunjhunu. Buses for all the major cities of Rajasthan like Jaipur, Ajmer, Kota, Bikaner, Jodhpur and Delhi  and other cities also operated from here. All the buses operated from Sikar and Jhunjhunu depot passes through Nawalgarh as well as other depot buses also passes through Nawalgarh.

Another important addition to the list is the Roadways Bus Terminal in the Memory of Late Sh. Radheshyam R Morarka, in Nawalgarh, which was inaugurated on 21 April 2011 by Rajasthan Minister of Transport and Sanskrit Education, Sh. Brij Kishor Sharma in the presence of Minister of State for Health, and Science & technology Dr. Rajkumar Sharma. The project, constructed under the ‘Development of Tourist Circuit under the Integrated Scheme’ of the central government, has cost about Rs. 1.05 crore to Sewajyoti. Objective behind the development of this complex is important for another reason. Nawalgarh is an important tourist destination and it was important to provide basic transport infrastructure to the tourists visiting the city and the area. The complex has also resulted in generation of new employment opportunities for local youth.

Prior to this bus terminal's development, passengers waiting for buses used to suffer under the broad sunlight. There were no necessary facilities available for the passengers and drivers. However, now Nawalgarh boasts of a well planned bus terminal with all important amenities and facilities such as a canteen, bathroom, resting place, book shops, communication booths etc. The terminal building is surrounded by green lush trees which gives the entire area an attractive look. Construction of bus terminal has also help manage the traffic in the city.

Air

In popular culture 
Many Bollywood/Hollywood/Tollywood movies are shot in Nawalgarh like Paheli, Ae Dil e Mushkil, Pinjar etc.

Gallery

See also
 Shekhawati

References 

Chandramani Sr. Sec School, Nawalgarh

External links 

 Nawalgarh map
Nawalgarh Online
Ramgarh Shekhawati
Roop Niwas Kothi

 

Cities and towns in Jhunjhunu district
Tourist attractions in Jhunjhunu district